A special election was held in  on April 12–13, 1802 to fill a vacancy resulting from the resignation of Thomas Sumter (DR) on December 15, 1801, upon being elected to the Senate.

Election results

Winn took his seat January 24, 1803

See also
List of special elections to the United States House of Representatives

References

South Carolina 1802 04
South Carolina 1802 04
1802 04
South Carolina 04
United States House of Representatives 04
United States House of Representatives 1802 04